These are the official results of the Men's 20 km walk event at the 2002 European Championships in Munich, Germany, held on August 6, 2002. Spain's Paquillo Fernández set a new championships record, clocking a total time of 1:18:37, eight seconds faster than the winning time set by Russia's Mikhail Shchennikov in 1994.

Medalists

Abbreviations
All times shown are in hours:minutes:seconds

Records

Final

See also
 2002 Race Walking Year Ranking

References
 Results
 Official Results
 IAAF Year Ranking

Walk 20 km
Racewalking at the European Athletics Championships